Turbo intercostalis, common name  the ribbed turban, is a species of sea snail, marine gastropod mollusk in the family Turbinidae.

Description
The length of the shell varies between 25 mm and 80 mm. The solid, perforate shell has an ovate-conic shape. Its color pattern is green or gray, radiately flammulated with black, green or brown, sometimes unicolored. The six whorls are convex and sometimes subangulate above. They contain numerous unequal revolving lirae and obsolescent incremental striae. The aperture is round, the upper angle sometimes separated from the body whorl, and projecting. The base of the shell is rounded. The columella is excavated at the umbilicus.

The circular operculum contains five whorls. Its outer surface is granulose, green or olivaceous at its center, yellowish at the margins.

Distribution
This marine species occurs of Western and Southwestern Australia; in the Indian Ocean off Chagos, the Mascarene Basin and the Hawaiian Islands.

References

 Reeve, L.A. 1842. New species of the genera Trochus and Turbo. Proceedings of the Zoological Society of London 1842: 184–186 
 Menke, C.T. 1843. Molluscorum Novae Hollandiae Specimen in Libraria Aulica Hahniana. Hannoverae : Libraria Aulica Hahniana pp. 1–46.
 Pease, W.H. 1861. Descriptions of 47 new species of shells from the Sandwich Islands, in the collection of H. Cuming. Proceedings of the Zoological Society of London 1860: 431–438 
 Tomlin, J.R. le B. 1936. Notes from the British Museum. VII. Turbo intercostalis Menke. Proceedings of the Malacological Society of London 22: 137–138 
 Satyamurti, S.T. 1952. Mollusca of Krusadai Is. I. Amphineura and Gastropoda. Bulletin of the Madras Government Museum, Natural History ns 1(no. 2, pt 6): 267 pp., 34 pls 
 Wilson, B.R. & Gillett, K. 1971. Australian Shells: illustrating and describing 600 species of marine gastropods found in Australian waters. Sydney : Reed Books 168 pp
 Cernohorsky, W.O. 1978. Tropical Pacific marine shells. Sydney : Pacific Publications 352 pp., 68 pls.
 Kay, E.A. 1979. Hawaiian Marine Shells. Reef and shore fauna of Hawaii. Section 4 : Mollusca. Honolulu, Hawaii : Bishop Museum Press Bernice P. Bishop Museum Special Publication Vol. 64(4) 653 pp.
 Drivas, J. & M. Jay (1988). Coquillages de La Réunion et de l'île Maurice
 Wilson, B. 1993. Australian Marine Shells. Prosobranch Gastropods. Kallaroo, Western Australia : Odyssey Publishing Vol. 1 408 pp.
 Alf A. & Kreipl K. (2003). A Conchological Iconography: The Family Turbinidae, Subfamily Turbininae, Genus Turbo. Conchbooks, Hackenheim Germany
 Williams, S.T. (2007). Origins and diversification of Indo-West Pacific marine fauna: evolutionary history and biogeography of turban shells (Gastropoda, Turbinidae). Biological Journal of the Linnean Society, 2007, 92, 573–592.

External links
 

intercostalis
Gastropods described in 1846